Pre Pleasure is the third studio album by Australian singer-songwriter Julia Jacklin. It was released on 26 August 2022 under Polyvinyl Record Co. and Transgressive Records.

At the 2022 ARIA Music Awards, the album earned Jacklin a nomination for Best Solo Artist. The album was nominated for Best Independent Release and Best Adult Contemporary Album.

The album was nominated for Australian Album of the Year at the 2022 J Awards.

The album was nominated for the 2022 Australian Music Prize.

Critical reception 

Pre Pleasure received critical acclaim from music critics upon its release. At Metacritic, which assigns a normalised rating out of 100 to reviews from mainstream publications, the album received an average score of 84, based on 18 reviews, indicating "universal acclaim". Kitty Empire of The Observer gave the album four out of five stars, describing it as "a record about the impossibility of communication, and never quite solving your problems". Bella Fleming of The Line of Best Fit indicates that this is Julia's most punchy album so far, "a testament to Julia Jacklin’s ability to adapt and grow as a songwriter". Ellie Robinson of NME wrote that "the material here is some of Jacklin’s most intense, never holding back with her gut-punching ruminations on religion, sex and trauma".

Track listing
All songs are written by Julia Jacklin.
"Lydia Wears a Cross" – 4:02
"Love, Try Not to Let Go" – 3:44
"Ignore Tenderness" – 3:09
"I Was Neon" – 4:03
"Too in Love to Die" – 3:36
"Less of a Stranger" – 4:32
"Moviegoer" – 3:47
"Magic" – 2:59
"Be Careful with Yourself" – 3:48
"End of a Friendship" – 4:24

Personnel

Julia Jacklin – vocals, backing vocals, electric guitar, nylon string guitar, piano
Will Kidman – electric guitar, acoustic guitar, Hammond organ, vibraphone
Adam Kinner – saxophone on "Moviegoer"
Karen Ng – clarinet on "Moviegoer"
Owen Pallett – string arrangements on "Ignore Tenderness" and "End of a Friendship"
Marcus Paquin – synthesizer, drum machine, acoustic guitar
Laurie Torres – drums, percussion
Ben Whiteley – bass guitar, acoustic guitar, piano, synthesizer
Arrangements performed by the Macedonian Symphonic Orchestra

Production
Julia Jacklin – producer, photography
Marcus Paquin – producer, engineer, mixer
Karolane Carbonneau – assistant engineer
Joao Carvalho – mastering
Nick Mekk – cover photography
Sebastian White – design

Charts

References 

2022 albums
ARIA Award-winning albums
Julia Jacklin albums
Polyvinyl Record Co. albums
Transgressive Records albums